"Happy" is a song written by Michel Legrand and Smokey Robinson and first recorded by Bobby Darin. The song was first released as a single by Bobby Darin on November 23, 1972, peaking #67 on the Billboard Hot 100, it was his last single to hit the chart. The song was included on his posthumous Motown LP Darin: 1936–1973.

A version of the song by Michael Jackson was featured on Jackson's 1973 album Music & Me. Robinson also recorded a version of the song, included on Robinson's 1975 album A Quiet Storm.

Background
According to Robinson, the song was inspired by the film's melody, which was originally composed by Michel Legrand.  He explained, "I was looking at the movie one day, and I was listening to that melody, and I thought it was just such a beautiful melody, until I wanted to write some words for that melody, which I did, and I went and I sang them for Berry Gordy, and he was really upset because I didn't write them before he finished the movie so they could've been in the movie."

Michael Jackson recording
Michael Jackson recorded the song for the Motown label in 1973. The song featured on Jackson's album Music & Me. Its full title is "Happy (Love Theme from Lady Sings the Blues)", although Michael's version was never featured in the film, there was an instrumental version used, however, it was not featured on the soundtrack for Lady Sings the Blues.  Michael Jackson's single was first released in Australia, backed by "In Our Small Way".

Jackson continued to perform the track in concert as late as 1977, citing it as one of his favorite songs.

In 1983, the song was released as a single in the UK to promote Motown's 18 Greatest Hits compilation album, on which the song was included. Upon its release, "Happy" (credited to Michael Jackson plus The Jackson 5) peaked at #52 on the British pop chart.

Charts

Other cover versions
It was later recorded by the song's composer, Smokey Robinson, and appeared on his landmark solo album A Quiet Storm.
The Spanish teen group La Pandilla also recorded a Spanish-language version of the song for their 1974 album El Alacrán. 
Dominican singer Benny Sadel released a merengue version of the Spanish-language rendition of the song on his 2002 album La Negra Mia.

Notes

References
Halstead, Craig and Chris Cadman (2003). Michael Jackson: The Solo Years. Authors OnLine. 
George, Nelson (2004). Michael Jackson: The Ultimate Collection booklet. Sony BMG.

Michael Jackson songs
1973 singles
1983 singles
Songs with music by Michel Legrand
Songs written by Smokey Robinson
Motown singles
Song recordings produced by Hal Davis
Rhythm and blues ballads
Bobby Darin songs
1972 songs